The Angle Farm, also known as Maplebrow, is a historic home located southeast of Mercersburg in Montgomery Township, Franklin County, Pennsylvania. A three-part, two-story, five-bay log and timber frame dwelling, it is supported by a fieldstone foundation.

This property was listed on the National Register of Historic Places in 1979.

History and architectural features
During the early 19th century, John Angle acquired property in Montgomery Township, Franklin County, Pennsylvania. Situated southeast of the community of Mercersburg, the property was subsequently improved by Angle and members of his family.

The original three-bay log section of this historic home was built roughly between 1800 and 1815; two additional bays were added during the 1850s. The home is sheathed in stucco and board-and-batten siding. A modern frame kitchen wing is attached to the rear. It has a one-story full length front porch, which was added during the 20th century, and a slate roof. Also located on the property are a contributing springhouse and frame stable.

This property was listed on the National Register of Historic Places in 1979. Katherine H. Ritchey of Welsh Run in Chambersburg, Pennsylvania was the owner and occupant of the property at the time of announcements by newspapers in 1980 of the home's placement on the National Register.

References

External links
 Angle Farm (profile), in "Philadelphia Architects and Buildings." Philadelphia, Pennsylvania: The Athenaeum of Philadelphia, retrieved online September 28, 2019.

Houses on the National Register of Historic Places in Pennsylvania
Houses completed in 1815
Houses in Franklin County, Pennsylvania
National Register of Historic Places in Franklin County, Pennsylvania